Neeye Nijam is a 2005 Indian Tamil language romantic drama film directed by Indhran. The film stars newcomer Shaan Vijay, Sumesh and Tejashree, with Ajay Rathnam, Delhi Ganesh, S. Selvam, M. S. Bhaskar, Maaran, Manjari, Kousalya Senthamarai and Bharathi playing supporting roles. The film, produced by P. G. Sadasivan and V. Udhayakumar, had musical score by John Peter. The film was slated for the end of November 2004 but it was released on 27 May 2005.

Plot

In Kotagiri, the carefree college student Chandru (Shaan Vijay) falls in love with his college mate Priya (Tejashree). Chandru lives with his parents (S. Selvam and Bharathi) while Priya lives her grandparents (Delhi Ganesh and Kousalya Senthamarai). Chandru proposes his love to Priya but she rejects, he then follows her everywhere and compels her to love him. She gets sick of him and files a complaint to the police against him thus the police arrest Chandru and beat him up to forget her. Chandru's mother Suguna decides to intervene and tries to convince Priya to marry her son and Priya told her why she refused to accept Chandru's love.

In the past, Priya was hit by a car and Sandhya (Manjari) rushes her to the hospital, Sandhya even bore the costs of her operation and Priya was saved. Priya and Sandhya became best friends. Sandhya then requested her to marry her brother Anand (Sumesh) who was studying a Master of Business Administration in the US and Priya promised to marry her brother. Sandhya went back to the US to bring her brother to India. Thereafter, Sandhya died in the US, her brother became depressed and decided to settle in Colombo.

After hearing it from his mother, Chandru sacrifices his love and decides to help Priya. Chandru goes to Colombo and successfully convinces him to marry Priya. For the engagement, Anand comes to Kotagiri. Priya changes her mind and finally understands Chandru's feelings, Anand supports her decision. Many years later, Anand visits Chandru and Priya to inform about his wedding. Chandru and Priya are now a happily married couple and they named their daughter Sandhya.

Cast

Production

Indhran, who had directed films like Solaikuyil (1989), Malai Chaaral (1991) and Kaadhale Nimmadhi (1998), made his return with En Kannil Yen Vizhunthai under the banner Himalaya International produced by P. G. Sadasivan and V. Udhayakumar. Apart from new faces Shaan Vijay and Sumesh, the film has actress Tejashree playing the heroine for the time. The songs "Dangerous" and "Neeye Nijam" were shot in Colombo, the rest of the shooting took place in Ooty and in Kotagiri. Newcomer John Peter had scored the music and Nirmal Raja cranked the camera. Indhran then later changed the title from En Kannil Yen Vizhunthai to Neeye Nijam.

Soundtrack

The film score and the soundtrack were composed by John Peter. The soundtrack features 6 tracks with lyrics written by Muthu Vijayan, Kadhal Mathi, Shanmugaseelan and Jothibasu.

References

External links

2005 films
2000s Tamil-language films
2005 romantic drama films
Indian romantic drama films
Films shot in Ooty
Films shot in Sri Lanka